Urian Brereton was a Groom of the Privy Chamber to King Henry VIII. While in this role his older brother William Brereton, also a Groom of the Privy Chamber, was executed along with other conspirators for high treason and adultery with Anne Boleyn.

In 1526 he was appointed Ranger of Delamere Forest and Escheator of Cheshire. Brereton had a close personal relationship with Queen Anne, to the extent that she may have named one of her lap dogs after him. Despite both the Queen's and his brother's execution he continued to enjoy the King's favour, receiving the bulk of William's Cheshire estates—amounting to over 200 acres—from the King. In 1538 he was appointed Sheriff of Flint, and in July that year he became attorney to the King. Following the Dissolution of the Monasteries, the King granted Brereton the assets of Newnham Priory and Chester Priory. Brereton was knighted in 1544 by the Earl of Hertford for valour during the Burning of Leith.

Brereton was responsible for the construction of Handforth Hall, where he died on 19 March 1577. He was buried in St Mary's Church, Cheadle.

Brereton was the son of Sir Randle Brereton, grandfather of Ambrose Barlow, and great-grandfather of Sir William Brereton, 1st Baronet.

References

1505 births
1577 deaths
Brereton family
People from Cheshire
English courtiers
English knights
Court of Henry VIII